The Port of Nanjing is located in Nanjing, Jiangsu Province, China, and is the largest inland port in the world (depending on how you classify the ports in the Yangtze Delta), with throughput reaching 191 million tons of cargo in 2012. Nanjing Port has a long history reaching back to A.D 229, when it became a major seaport. It is situated in the lower reaches of the Yangtze River, just before the start of the Yangtze Delta. The Port has authority over 208 km of Yangtze River shoreline, 110 km in the North Shore and 98 km in the South Shore. As of 2010, it operated six public ports and three industrial ports.

See also
 List of ports in China

References

River ports
Transport in Nanjing
Ports and harbours of China
Buildings and structures in Nanjing
Yangtze River